Bloomfield Cricket and Athletic Club Ground, in Colombo, Sri Lanka, has staged first-class and List A cricket matches since 1991. It is the home ground of the Bloomfield Cricket and Athletic Club cricket team.

Location
The ground is on Reid Avenue, in the Cinnamon Gardens district of Colombo, next to the Colombo Racecourse football ground.

History
Bloomfield Cricket and Athletic Club made the ground their home in the 1970s. The first first-class match was in December 1991 between Antonians Sports Club and Kurunegala Youth Cricket Club. Bloomfield played their first first-class match there in 1994-95 and have played there ever since. Up to the end of the 2018–19 season 187 first-class matches have been played at the ground. Since the first List A match at the ground in July 1994, 95 List A matches have been played there.

The highest first-class score is 237 by Shehan Jayasuriya for Chilaw Marians in 2016–17. The best bowling figures are 9 for 15 by Mario Villavarayan for Bloomfield in 1996–97.

References

External links
Bloomfield Cricket and Athletic Club Ground at Cricinfo
Bloomfield Cricket and Athletic Club Ground at CricketArchive

Cricket grounds in Colombo
Sport in Colombo